The Lancia Flaminia (Tipo 813/823/824/826) is a luxury car produced by Italian automaker Lancia from 1957 until 1970. It was Lancia's flagship model at that time, replacing the Aurelia. It was available throughout its lifetime as saloon, coupé and cabriolet. The Flaminia coupé and convertible were coachbuilt cars with bodies from several prestigious Italian coachbuilders. Four "presidential" stretched limousine Flaminias were produced by Pininfarina for use on state occasions.

There were 12,633 Flaminias sold over 13 years. Coupés outsold the four-door saloon, an unusual occurrence otherwise seen at the time only in American compact and midsize models whose coupé versions were standard factory models that cost the same or less than the sedan, while the Flaminia coupés' coachbuilt bodies made them considerably more expensive than the limousine-like Berlina.

Name 
The Flaminia was named after the Via Flaminia, the road leading from Rome to Ariminum (Rimini). This respected the established Lancia tradition of naming individual models after Roman roads.

Development

The Flaminia's chassis was a development of the Aurelia's, but was significantly upgraded. The front suspension was changed to a more conventional configuration with double wishbones, coil springs, telescopic shock absorbers, and an anti-roll bar. The rear suspension retained the De Dion setup, with a transaxle mounted at the rear as in the Aurelia. The first Berlina was available with drum brake or discs, all other models used discs only. They benefitted from radial tyre technology Pirelli Cinturato 165H400 CA67.

The original two bodies of the Flaminia were developed by Pinin Farina and modelled after his two Aurelia-based motor show specials, named Florida. The Florida I, presented at the 1955 Turin Auto Show, was a saloon with rear suicide doors. The Florida II, presented a year later at the Salon International de l'Auto in Geneva, was a 2-door coupé, and became Battista Farina's personal car of choice. The production version of the Lancia Flaminia appeared in 1957.

Flaminia development timeline:
Spring 1955: Pinin Farina Florida 4-door based on Lancia Aurelia chassis.
March 1956 (Geneva): Pinin Farina Florida 2-door based on Lancia Aurelia chassis.
April 1956 (Turin): Lancia Flaminia with 'suicide' door and coil spring suspension.
March 1957 (Geneva): Lancia Flaminia with traditional door arrangement.

Engines

The Flaminia's engine was an evolution of the world's first production V6, which was introduced in the Aurelia. It had increased bore and decreased stroke. The engines were mounted longitudinally, powering the rear wheels through a 4-speed rear-mounted transaxle. A version with increased displacement was introduced in 1962.

Body styles

Flaminia Berlina
The first Flaminia berlina was revealed at the Turin Auto Show in March 1957. It differed from the production version by having Florida-inspired suicide rear doors that opened opposite to the front doors. All the other versions have front-hinged doors. The saloon version of the car was generally designated by the Italian word for this body style, Berlina. Designed by Pininfarina and based on the Florida I prototype, this was the only body to be built by Lancia themselves, as well as becoming the only body to last through the entire production period. There were 3,344 Berlinas built with the 2.5 L engine (102/110 bhp specification), and additional 599 with the 2.8 L (128 bhp). They were assembled at Lancia's old facility at Borgo San Paolo as the last model to be built there.

Flaminia Coupé

The Coupé was also designed by Pininfarina, and built by the coachbuilder. It was very similar to the Florida II prototype with a 2+2 layout. Like all other 2-door versions, the Coupé had a shortened wheelbase relative to the Berlina. The front end of the Coupé does not differ from the Berlina majorly, but the headlight frames are completely round, whereas they point slightly upwards in the saloon. The Coupe also fitted the unusual 175HR400 Pirelli Cinturato CA67 millimetric tyre. 5,236 Coupés (4,151 with the 2.5, 1,085 with the 2.8) were built until 1967.

Flaminia GT, GTL and Convertible

Carrozzeria Touring designed and built these aluminum bodied two-door versions, which can be easily distinguished by their four-round headlights (rather than two on Pininfarina Flaminias), and a shorter cabin - the wheelbase was decreased significantly for the GT and Convertibile, allowing for only two seats to be mounted. The GT was a coupé, while the Convertibile was obviously a cabriolet version (with optional hardtop). The GTL, introduced in 1962, was a 2+2 version of the GT with a slightly longer wheelbase. The Convertibile was in production until 1964, with 847 made in total (180 with the 2.8), while the GT and GTL lasted until 1965, with 1718 GTs and 300 GTLs made (out of which, 168 GTs and 297 GTLs with the 2.8).

Flaminia Sport and Super Sport
The Sport was built by Zagato, and was also a two-seater. It used the same shorter wheelbase chassis as the GT, and had a very distinctive rounded aluminium body with pop-out handles. The Super Sport replaced the Sport in 1964, with the introduction of the 2.8 L  engine. The first Sports had flush covered headlights, later changed to more classic round ones. The Super Sport also saw some changes - the rear was updated to a Kammback, while the front was made more aerodynamic with distinctive tear-shape headlight casings. Until 1967, 593 Sports and Super Sports were built (99 Preseries, 344 Sports, 150 Supersports).

Flaminia 335 "Presidenziale"

When in 1960 Queen Elizabeth II announced her visit to Italy, the then President Giovanni Gronchi commissioned Pininfarina to supply four stretched Lancia Flaminia limousines to appropriately service the visit, and also renew the dated presidential fleet. The cars were built between 1960 and 1961 in the record time of six months, to a detailed specification and with the assistance of General Motors as regards the various electrical extras.
They were seven-seater landaulettes, in dark blue livery with black Connolly Leather upholstery, a Voxson radio and Pirelli tyres.
They were first used in Turin for the inauguration of the Celebrazioni del Centenario dell'Unità d'Italia (celebrations for the centenary of Italy's unification), and subsequently for the state visit of Queen Elizabeth II.

This model was officially called the Flaminia 335 (due to its wheelbase of 335 cm, or 131.9 inches), and is also commonly referred to as Presidenziale or Quirinale (after Quirinal Palace, the residence of the President of the Italian Republic). The individual cars were named Belsito, Belmonte, Belvedere and Belfiore.

All four survive today, and were restored by Fiat Auto in 2001.
Two of them are on display in automobile museums: one at Museo Nazionale dell'Automobile, to which it was donated by President Carlo Azeglio Ciampi, and another at Museo Storico della Motorizzazione Militare together with other retired presidential cars.
The remaining two are still kept in service for the most solemn state occasions, like the Republic Day parade or presidential inaugurations.
There were rumours of a fifth 335 being donated to the Queen, but this seems unsubstantiated.

Coupé Speciale

A one-off coupé built in 1963 and designed by Tom Tjaarda at Pininfarina, based on the short chassis 2.8 litre triple carburettor model.

References

External links

 flaminiagt.co.uk - A record of the restoration of a 1961 Lancia Flaminia GT Touring

Flaminia
Sedans
Coupés
Convertibles
1960s cars
Cars introduced in 1957
Pininfarina
Luxury vehicles
Flagship vehicles
Rear-wheel-drive vehicles